David Stasavage is an American political scientist.

Stasavage attended a bachelor's degree at Cornell University in 1989, then obtained his doctorate from Harvard University in 1995. He subsequently went to Europe, working successively for the World Bank, the Organisation for Economic Co-operation and Development, the Centre for the Study of African Economies, and the Bank of England. Stasavage began teaching as a faculty associate within the London School of Economics in 1999. By 2005, his final year at the LSE, Stasavage had acquired the rank of reader. Stasavage returned to the United States in 2006, as an associate professor at New York University. In 2009, Stasavage was appointed to a full professorship. Since 2015, he has served as Julius Silver Professor of Politics. Stasavage was later appointed dean for the social sciences. In 2015, he was elected a member of the American Academy of Arts and Sciences.

Selected publications

References

Living people
Year of birth missing (living people)
American political scientists
Academics of the London School of Economics
Harvard University alumni
Cornell University alumni
American expatriates in the United Kingdom
New York University faculty
People associated with the Bank of England
21st-century American male writers
World Bank people
OECD officials
Fellows of the American Academy of Arts and Sciences
American university and college faculty deans
Political economists
21st-century American economists
20th-century American economists